Homalopterula ripleyi is a species of ray-finned fish in the genus Homalopterula.

References

Balitoridae
Fish described in 1940